The 2001–02 season of the NOFV-Oberliga was the eighth season of the league at tier four (IV) of the German football league system.

The NOFV-Oberliga was split into two divisions, NOFV-Oberliga Nord and NOFV-Oberliga Süd. The champions of each, Hertha BSC (A) and Dynamo Dresden, entered into a play-off against each other for the right to play in the 2002–03 Regionalliga Nord. Dynamo Dresden won 1–0 over two legs and thus gained promotion.

North

South

Promotion playoff

First leg

Second leg

External links 
 NOFV-Online – official website of the North-East German Football Association 

NOFV-Oberliga seasons
4
Germ